LARC can refer to any of several things:

 The NASA Langley Research Center in Hampton, Virginia, USA.
 The London Action Resource Centre, a social centre in London
 Liver and activation-regulated chemokine, a small cytokine belonging to the CC chemokine family that is now officially called Chemokine (C-C motif) ligand 20 (CCL20), 
 UNIVAC LARC, computer
 LARC-V an amphibious resupply vehicle.
 LARC-XV an amphibious resupply vehicle.
 LARC-LX an amphibious resupply vehicle (which could also transport the smaller LARCs).
 Kamen Rider Larc, a character from Kamen Rider Blade.
 Long Acting Reversible Contraception, a contraceptive device that lasts longer than typical birth controls.
 List Authorised Racket Coverings, in table tennis, a comprehensive list of rubber racket coverings authorised by the ITTF
 Licensed Asbestos Removal Contractor